On Tat Estate and On Tai Estate are public housing estates in Anderson Road, Tai Sheung Tok, Sau Mau Ping, Kwun Tong District and the parts of Development at Anderson Road. The former comprises 11 blocks with a total of 9,356 flats while the latter comprises 11 blocks with 8,561 units.

History
The site of the estates was formerly a vegetated hillslope below Anderson Road. Under the "Development at Anderson Road" (DAR) project, the site was reformed under the supervision of the Civil Engineering and Development Department (CEDD) to provide approximately 20 hectares of useable land. In addition to site formation, the DAR project included the construction of supporting infrastructure, including roads, drains, and engineered slopes. The buildable land was allocated for public housing development as well as supporting government, institutional, and community facilities. The DAR project, which cost HK$3.4 billion, was formally completed in December 2016.

The public housing component of the project, originally intended to provide 16,100 units for 48,000 people, was completed from 2016 to 2018. The housing blocks comprise On Tat and On Tai estates, which are located at either end of the dumbbell-shaped DAR site. They are linked by On Sau Road, which runs the length of the site and connects to New Clear Water Bay Road in the north and Po Lam Road in the south.

Houses

On Tat Estate

On Tai Estate

Covid Pandemic
Chi Tai House at On Tai Estate was sealed on 23 February 2022. Ming Tai House was placed under locked down on 24–25 February.

Education
On Tat Estate is in Primary One Admission (POA) School Net 48. Within the school net are multiple aided schools (operated independently but funded with government money) and Kwun Tong Government Primary School.

References

External links

Sau Mau Ping
Public housing estates in Hong Kong
Residential buildings completed in 2016
Residential buildings completed in 2017
Residential buildings completed in 2018